Okuku is a small farming community located in North Canterbury, New Zealand, lying 20 kilometres northwest of Rangiora. Okuku consists of a mix of flat and undulating farmland, and river beds that drain a catchment area in the foothills to the north. Okuku is bounded to the south by the Ashley River  / Rakahuri (the major river in the area), to the east by the Okuku River, and to the west by the Garry River. Mount Thomas is the highest point at a height of 1023m.

Demographics

Okuku had a population of 726 at the 2018 New Zealand census, an increase of 78 people (12.0%) since the 2013 census, and an increase of 231 people (46.7%) since the 2006 census. There were 258 households. There were 360 males and 363 females, giving a sex ratio of 0.99 males per female. The median age was 42.6 years (compared with 37.4 years nationally), with 156 people (21.5%) aged under 15 years, 99 (13.6%) aged 15 to 29, 405 (55.8%) aged 30 to 64, and 66 (9.1%) aged 65 or older.

Ethnicities were 95.5% European/Pākehā, 3.3% Māori, 2.1% Pacific peoples, 0.8% Asian, and 2.1% other ethnicities (totals add to more than 100% since people could identify with multiple ethnicities).

The proportion of people born overseas was 16.9%, compared with 27.1% nationally.

Although some people objected to giving their religion, 61.2% had no religion, 28.1% were Christian and 1.2% had other religions.

Of those at least 15 years old, 99 (17.4%) people had a bachelor or higher degree, and 84 (14.7%) people had no formal qualifications. The median income was $39,400, compared with $31,800 nationally. The employment status of those at least 15 was that 339 (59.5%) people were employed full-time, 96 (16.8%) were part-time, and 18 (3.2%) were unemployed.

References

Populated places in Canterbury, New Zealand
Waimakariri District